Peter Voß (29 June 1891 – 9 January 1979) was a German film actor.

Partial filmography

 Love and Trumpets (1925) - Rekrut Dirmoser
 Struggle for the Matterhorn (1928) - Edward Whymper
 Diane - Die Geschichte einer Pariserin (1929) - Kapitän Rimbaud
 The Jolly Peasant (1929)
 Tracks in the Snow (1929) - Klaus Meill
 Storm of Love (1929) - Matei
 Katharina Knie (1929) - Rothhacker, Gutsbesitzer
 The Ring of the Empress (1930)
 Two Worlds (1930) - Stanislaus (German Version)
 Love's Carnival (1930) - Harold Hofmann - Oberleutnant
 Two Worlds (1930) - Leutnant Stanislaus von Kaminsky
 The Stranger (1931)
 The Night of Decision (1931) - Viktor Boris Sablin
 The Paw (1931) - Propagandachef Gastal
 Sergeant X (1932)
 Die Vier vom Bob 13 (1932) - Baron Plessow
 The Heath Is Green (1932) - Walter - Ein junger Förster
 Death Over Shanghai (1932) - John Baxter
 Schüsse an der Grenze (1933) - Nr. 34
 Ripening Youth (1933) - Studienassesor Dr. Kerner
 The Love Hotel (1933) - Joachim, Kunstmaler
 Mother and Child (1934) - Jürgen
 The Riders of German East Africa (1934) - Englischer Farmer Robert Cresswell
 My Life for Maria Isabella (1935) - Rittmeister Graf Bottenlauben
  (1935) - Wellington
 Anschlag auf Schweda (1935) - Schweda
 Fährmann Maria (1936) - The Man in Black (Death)
 The Paris Adventure (1936) - Mitja, Fürst Artamanow
 The Hound of the Baskervilles (1937) - Lord Henry Baskerville
 Alarm in Peking (1937) - Captain Cunningham
 After Midnight (1938) - Petroff
 Sergeant Berry (1938) - Oberst Turner
 Water for Canitoga (1939) - Gilbert Trafford
 A Man Astray (1940) - Sully
 Trenck, der Pandur (1940) - Fürst Khevenhüller
 Achtung! Feind hört mit! (1940) - General vom Technischen Amt der Wehrmacht
 Kampfgeschwader Lützow (1941) - Major Hagen
 Laugh Pagliacci (1943)
 Lache Bajazzo (1943) - Claudio Lanzoni
 Titanic (1943) - Schiffsarzt (uncredited)
 When the Evening Bells Ring (1951) - Gutsherr von Brenda
 When the Alpine Roses Bloom (1955) - Hotelbesitzer Wernecke
 Darkness Fell on Gotenhafen (1960) - Kapitän Petersen (final film role)

References

External links
 

1891 births
1979 deaths
German male film actors
German male silent film actors
Actors from Schleswig-Holstein
20th-century German male actors